Aerial techniques, also known as "high-flying moves" are maneuvers in professional wrestling using the ring's posts and ropes as aids, in many cases to demonstrate the speed and agility of smaller, nimble and acrobatically inclined wrestlers preferring this style instead of throwing or locking the opponent. Due to injuries caused by these high risk moves, some promotions have banned the use of some of them. The next list of maneuvers was made under general categories whenever possible.

Attacks

187 
This move sees a wrestler jumping forward from an elevated position while holding a steel chair or other weapon, driving the weapon onto an opponent lying prone on the mat. This move was innovated by New Jack and named in reference to the prison slang term 187.

Diving chops

Arm twist ropewalk chop
The wrestler takes hold of one of the opponent's wrists, twisting the arm into an arm wrench. The wrestler then climbs up the corner turnbuckles and takes a walk on the top rope before falling down striking the opponent's head, back, shoulder or nape with a chop. The move combination is better known as Old School. Invented by Don Jardine and popularized by The Undertaker, who was Jardine's protégé. Japanese wrestler Jinsei Shinzaki uses the move while praying as the Ogami Watari.

Diving overhead chop
Standing on the top turnbuckle, the attacking wrestler proceeds to jump in order to deliver an overhead chop to a standing opponent's head. This is one of the most recognizable signature moves performed by Manabu Nakanishi. This was also used by WWE Hall of Famer Tatanka as a signature move called, "Diving Tomahawk Chop".

Diving clothesline
The attacking wrestler jumps from an elevated position as extending their arm out from the side of the body and parallel to the ground, hitting the standing opponent in the neck or chest, knocking them over. A version of this move, called a flying lariat, involving the wrestler wrapping the attacking arm around the opponent's neck.

Diving double axe handle
Also known as diving axe handle, diving double axe handle smash, or diving double sledge, this is accomplished by jumping from the top turnbuckle to the mat or floor and striking the opponent with two fists held together in the fashion of holding an axe. This is usually done on a standing or rising opponent. A common variation sees the wrestler standing over the top rope, facing away from the ring. From this point, the wrestler jumps, twisting to face inside of the ring, and quickly clutching both fists together to strike the double axe handle. Used by Randy Savage.

Diving drops

Diving leg drop
Also called guillotine leg drop, this move sees a wrestler jumping from a raised platform landing the bottom side of one leg across the opponent's throat or chest. This move was used as the finisher of former WWE wrestler Fandango calling this move The Last Dance.

Moonsault leg drop
This variation sees the wrestler performing a moonsault but instead of landing on the opponent in a splash position, the wrestler continues the rotation to drive a leg across the downed opponent. 2 Cold Scorpio uses this move as a signature called Drop The Bomb.

Shooting star leg drop
The wrestler jumps forward from an elevated position following a full 360° or beyond rotation, driving a leg across the fallen opponent.

Somersault leg drop
The wrestler, standing on an elevated position, jumps and flips forward to land one leg on the opponent lying beneath. This move can also be performed from a standing non-elevated position although this variation is quite rare. Booker T used this move during his time in WCW naming the move, Harlem Hangover. 2 Cold Scorpio uses a variation of this move as a finisher which sees him, while facing away from the supine opponent, utilizing a single corkscrew with the move and calls it the Tumbleweed.

Diving elbow drop

Executed by diving onto a supine opponent with one elbow cocked, driving the elbow into the opponent as the wrestler falls on one of their sides.
The move was popularized by WWE Wrestler Randy "Macho Man" Savage, Former WWE superstar Kairi Sane used this move, named as InSane Elbow. Bayley also uses it as a homage to Randy Savage.

Diving 450 elbow drop
The wrestler dives forward from an elevated position performing a 450 somersault landing on the supine opponent with the elbow drop. Independent wrestler Flip Kendrick has used the move. John Morrison uses a modified version of this move which sees him utilizing a diving cartwheel motion during the move and uses this as a finisher calling it the Countdown to IMPACT, IMPACT Elbow (using both names while in Impact Wrestling), and Thursday Night Delight respectfully.

Diving back elbow drop

This less common variation sees a wrestler stand facing away from a standing or supine opponent and in an elevated position (usually the top turnbuckle). The wrestler then dives backwards to strike the opponent. Ted Dibiase has used this move against a supine opponent as a finisher.

Diving pointed elbow drop 
The wrestler sits on the top turnbuckle with a foot on each second rope facing a supine opponent. The wrestler then leaps forward while clasping both forearms together, landing on their knees, driving an elbow into the opponent. It was used by Bret Hart and Stone Cold Steve Austin.

Shooting star elbow drop 
This move sees a wrestler jumping forward from an elevated position followed by executing a mid-air backflip to land elbow first on an opponent lying on the mat.

Diving fist drop
A move in which a wrestler jumps down from the turnbuckle on an opponent, driving their fist into the opponent's head. While doing it, wrestlers have their front four knuckles out, and their thumb to the side. This move was popularized by Jerry Lawler as his finisher.

Diving headbutt
Also known as a diving headbutt drop, it is delivered from the turnbuckle to anywhere on the opponent's body. The move was accidentally invented by Harley Race, who adapted it as a signature move and it was then further popularized by The Dynamite Kid, Chris Benoit, Bam Bam Bigelow, D-Von Dudley, Tomoaki Honma and recently Daniel Bryan. It was later publicized that the move could cause severe spine, brain, leg or chest damage.

Diving knee drop
A move in which a wrestler jumps from the top turnbuckle, top rope, or the apron, landing one knee across a supine opponent. There is also a variation where a wrestler jumps from the elevated position and lands both knees across the prone opponent, referred to as a diving double knee drop.

Meteora

This version of the diving double knee drop sees the attacker performing the maneuver from an elevated platform, jumping forward onto a standing or seated upright opponent with each knee striking both of their shoulders simultaneously. Springboard, slingshot, and standing or running versions of this move are also possible with the latter being used while the attacker is charging towards an opponent, against a charging opponent, or a combination of both. Innovated by CIMA, who has used both a springboard and top rope version as finishing maneuvers in Dragon Gate, and named it after the Greek landmark where he proposed to his wife. American wrestlers Sasha Banks and Matt Sydal also use it as a signature move, the latter having also performed in Dragon Gate.

Shooting star knee drop
This move sees the wrestler jumping forward from the second turnbuckle, executing a mid-air backflip, landing knee first on an  opponent down all on fours. It is a finishing move used by "Speedball" Mike Bailey as Ultima Weapon.

Diving senton
This diving variation for a senton sees the wrestler landing back or buttocks first on the opponent's stomach or chest.

Backwards facing diving senton
The move sees an attacking wrestler jumping to the top turnbuckle or top rope facing away from the ring before falling down backwards onto the lying opponent. Popularize by Darby Allin as the Coffin Drop.

630° senton
The attacker on the top turnbuckle jumps and flips mid-air into a double front somersault to land sitting on the opponent below. It was innovated by Jack Evans and popularized by Ricochet who uses a corkscrew version of this move.

Corkscrew 630° senton
In this version, the wrestler facing away from the ring on the top turnbuckle performs a 180° mid-air turn while executing the maneuver. Jack Evans and Ninja Mack uses this move.

Diving seated senton

This variant has the wrestler using the tailbone and lower back to fall in a seated position forcing a standing opponent to the mat rather than using their whole back. Performed by jumping forward off a raised platform or springboarding on to the opponent's shoulders, forcing them to the ground. This can also be performed onto an opponent prone or supine on the mat. A variation of this move known as the Banzai Drop, popularized by Yokozuna, sees the wrestler standing over a fallen opponent next to the turnbuckle, then climbing up to the second rope and jumping down, landing on the opponent's stomach or chest.

Molly-Go-Round
This variant, which is technically described as a diving somersault seated senton is performed by flipping forward off a raised platform on to the shoulders of a standing opponent, forcing them to the ground into a pinning position. Innovated by Molly Holly. Tegan Nox uses this move.

Moonsault senton
The attacker jumps to the top turnbuckle or top rope facing away from the ring, and executes a moonsault, landing in an ordinary senton position. There is also a standing version of this move.

Senton bomb
In this variation, the attacking wrestler executes a quick front somersault off the top turnbuckle, landing on the opponent back-first. Popularized by Jim Fullington and renaming it as Rolling Rock. The standing, running variation is known as a cannonball.

Corkscrew senton bomb
Another variant where the attacking wrestler facing to the ring does a 360° twist in the air before impact. A.J. Styles popularized this by calling it the Spiral Tap.

High-angle senton bomb

A variant which sees a wrestler leaping off the top turnbuckle keeping the body straight and arms out-stretched, resembling a swan dive and then waiting until the last moment to execute the flip, so is just barely complete when the attacker impacts  the opponent with upper back/shoulders. Invented by The Great Sasuke calling it Senton Atomico, Jeff Hardy popularized this move in North America, calling it Swanton Bomb.

Rolling senton bomb
Another variant where the attacking wrestler, facing away from the ring, does a 180° twist followed by the senton bomb. This was popularised by Jeff Hardy calling it Whisper in the Wind.

Shooting star senton
Jumping forward from an elevated position, the attacking wrestler executes a mid-air backflip ending in a senton.

Diving shoulder block
The wrestler dives from an elevated position tucking both arms in, and striking a standing opponent with one shoulder to the upper body.

Diving spear
A diving version of the takedown known as a spear. A wrestler will jump from a raised platform driving a shoulder into the torso as pulling both the opponent's legs, forcing them down to the mat.

Diving splash

This basic maneuver involves a wrestler jumping forward from a raised platform, landing stomach first horizontally across an opponent lying on the ground below. This move was popularized by Jimmy Snuka, naming it the “Superfly Splash,” for his “Superfly” gimmick, and is currently used by Tamina Snuka as a tribute to her father. Australian wrestler and former WWE NXT superstar Bronson Reed uses this as a finishing move called "The Tsunami Splash".

450° splash
Also known as firebird splash, involves an attacker facing the ring from the top of the turnbuckles, then performing a "Rudolph" (front somersault with 1 twists) to land the upper body's front on the opponent. This move was innovated by Japanese superstar Hayabusa, hence why it is also called the Firebird Splash. Scott Steiner introduced the move in 1987 before 2 Cold Scorpio popularized the move in the 1990s. It can also be dangerous when it cannot be executed properly, as WWE previously banned it in 2005 after Juventud Guerrera broke Paul London's face before they allowed Justin Gabriel to use it in 2010.

Corkscrew 450° splash
The move was innovated and popularized by Hayabusa, who named it the Phoenix splash. The wrestler facing away from the ring on the top turnbuckle performs a 180° turn in mid-air while performing a 450° splash onto a lying opponent. Kota Ibushi uses this move.

Imploding 450° splash
Also known as flaming star press or inverted / reverse 450° splash,  sees the attacking wrestler standing on the top turnbuckle facing away from the ring. Then jumping backwards executing a 450° splash inwards (facing the turnbuckle) onto a downed opponent on the mat. Mustafa Ali currently uses this move, naming it the 054.

Imploding corkscrew 450° splash
The attacking wrestler stands on the top turnbuckle facing towards the ring and performs a 180° turn in mid-air while performing a 450° splash inwards.

Corner slingshot splash
The wrestler places the opponent lying supine perpendicular to the turnbuckle. Then approaching to the turnbuckle in the same corner, grabbing a hold both hands on the top rope and climbing to the first or second rope, the wrestler bounces on the ropes before throwing both legs backwards and placing the body parallel to the mat as releasing the ropes, thus falling inwards and downwards to the ring squashing and pinning the opponent. Often referred to as Vader Bomb, for it was (Big Van) Vader who popularized it. Jack Swagger used this move as his signature in WWE, calling it a Swagger Bomb and is currently being used by Otis as the Dozer splash.

Diving crossbody
To perform the move, the wrestler jumps from an elevated position (usually the top turnbuckle) onto an opponent, landing horizontally across the opponent's torso, forcing them to the mat and usually resulting in a pinfall attempt. There is also a reversed version, called a reverse crossbody, where the wrestler faces away from the prone opponent before executing the maneuver. This move is one of the basic moves of lightweight wrestlers. This move was made famous as the finisher of WWE Hall of Famer Ricky "The Dragon" Steamboat. The Hurricane used diving crossboody as his finisher and named it the Cape.

Frog splash
This move is performed by leaping from the top rope, stretching out to a horizontal position, and bringing one's feet and hands inward and outward before landing.

Eddie Guerrero made the frog splash famous in the mid-1990s and early 2000s. However, the move itself was innovated by La Fiera in Mexico in the early 1980s. Later it was used by Art Barr in the late 1980s and was named by 2 Cold Scorpio who remarked Barr looked "like a frog" whilst performing the move which resulted in Barr naming it. After Barr's death in 1994, Guerrero used the move in tribute to his fallen tag team partner. After Guerrero's death in 2005, Christian Cage began using the move as a tribute to Guerrero. The legendary Hiroshi Tanahashi uses this move as High Fly Flow

There is a high-angle turning variation named the Five-Star Frog Splash where the opponent is not placed perpendicular to the corner. Instead, the attacker turns mid-air to land on the opponent in the splash position, regardless of which direction the opponent is lying in. It was made famous by ECW, WWF/E and TNA superstar Rob Van Dam as it was used as his finisher. He also uses a regular version, generally going halfway or more than halfway across the ring to hit his opponent. Lio Rush uses a split-legged version called the "Rush Hour". Montez Ford uses a spinning version of this move called “From the Heavens”. Cedric Alexander uses this as a finishing move called "Overtime".

Diving stomp

The wrestler jumps down from a raised platform onto an opponent, dropping one foot onto the opponent's body. A variation known as a diving double foot stomp sees the attacking wrestler jumping down from a raised platform on an opponent, driving both feet into the opponent. Finn Balor uses this as his finishing move, Coup de Grâce.

Moonsault double foot stomp
This variation sees the wrestler perform a moonsault, but instead of landing on a fallen opponent in the splash position, the wrestler continues the rotation driving both feet into the opponent. Sonjay Dutt uses this as an occasional finishing move, named Moonstomp.

Mushroom stomp
While situated on the middle turnbuckle, a wrestler jumps over a charging opponent, driving one or both feet into the opponent's back, pushing the opponent into the turnbuckle or down to the ground, before landing on their feet. The technique's name is a reference to the stomping attacks used by video game character Mario.

Flying body press
Differentiating themselves from a splash or  a senton, these maneuvers are performed from an upright position, using momentum and weight to run over a standing opponent or pin a fallen one.

Falling Thesz press
Sitting on the top turnbuckle, the attacking wrestler rests both feet with spread legs on the second ropes waiting for an incoming opponent, then jumps forward through springboarding to sit on the opponent's midsection as in a standing Thesz press.

Shooting star press
A technique invented by Jushin Thunder Liger. The wrestler jumps forward from an elevated position and presses their knees to their own chest, executes a backflip and lands on the opponent as if performing a body press. This move was used by Brock Lesnar and is Matt Sydal's finisher, but was popularized by Billy Kidman in WCW. The move was previously banned in WWE in 2005 for safety reasons, as the move can easily be botched and cause serious injuries, much like the piledriver. Mark Andrews of NXT UK uses this as a high-flying move called "Fall to pieces".

Corkscrew shooting star press
This move sees a wrestler jump forward while twisting 360° and performing a backflip. This move is used and has been popularized by PAC who called it the Red Arrow, and later the Black Arrow. It is also known for being used by Will Ospreay and Komander.

Flying kicks
Several attacks taken from eastern martial arts to Lucha libre, these are widely popular maneuvers amongst fans worldwide.

Diving calf kick
Standing over the top turnbuckle or top rope, the attacking wrestler jumps off and twists slightly so as soaring midair faces away from the opponent, connecting the side of their lead leg's calf-heel cord area to the opponent's face or chest.

Diving leg lariat
A leg lariat in which a wrestler jumps from a raised platform towards an opponent and wraps one leg around the opponent's head or neck, knocking them down to the ground.

Flying spinning heel kick
A move in which the wrestler jumps from an elevated position (usually the top turnbuckle) and strikes a standing opponent with a spinning heel kick mid-air.

Flying thrust kick
Executed when a wrestler jumps from a raised platform (usually the top turnbuckle), and performs a mid-air back kick on a standing opponent.

Missile dropkick
A move in which the wrestler jumps from an elevated position (usually the top turnbuckle) and strikes a standing opponent with the soles of both feet, essentially executive a diving version of a dropkick.

Throws

Diamond dust
This maneuver is performed by an attacking wrestler standing or sitting on an elevated platform facing the back of a standing opponent while applying an inverted facelock. From this position, the attacking wrestler somersaults forward to roll the inverted facelock into a  facelock. As they fall, the wrestler either drops to a seated position driving the opponent's jaw into their shoulder, or back-first forcing the opponent's face into the mat. Innovated by Masato Tanaka.

Diving hurricanrana
This move is executed by jumping forward off the top rope with legs apart, then straddling on a standing opponent's shoulders and using the momentum to snap off, rolling and throwing the opponent forward. This move was popularized by Lita as the Litacanrana. Rey Mysterio popularized a springboard version called the West Coast Pop, but rarely uses it in his later years due to knee injuries.

Frankensteiner
This variant is executed on an opponent sitting on the top turnbuckle. With the attacking wrestler's legs scissored around the opponent's head while they face each other, the wrestler  backflips to swing through the opponent's open legs, dragging the opponent into a forced somersault that distances the wrestler from the opponent, who lands back-first. The name comes from Scott Steiner, who possibly invented the move.

A handstand variation can also be used. With the opponent seated on the top turnbuckle facing the ring, the wrestler performs a handspring on the bottom turnbuckle, wrapping both shins or feet around the opponent's neck. The wrestler then throws both legs forward towards the ring, pulling and flipping over the opponent to the mat back first.

Rey Mysterio and Último Dragón uses a spinning version of this move which sees the wrestling positioned on the top rope behind the opponent seated on the same top rope facing the ring inward. The wrestler then places themselves on both the opponents shoulders, spins around 180 degrees, and executes the backflip to land chest first to flip the opponent onto their back. Último Dragón uses this move as a finisher and calls it the Dragonsteiner.

Reverse Frankensteiner
Also known as Inverted Frankensteiner or Poisoned Frankensteiner, this is executed on an opponent sitting on the top turnbuckle. However, the opponent is facing away from the ring on the top turnbuckle thus the opponent backflips over and lands face first. This move can also be performed to the outside of the ring if the opponent is facing the inside of the ring or sitting on one edge of the corner turnbuckle facing the audience both legs outside of the ring on the same side. There is also a standing variation of this move in which the wrestler jumps onto the opponent's shoulders from behind and then flips backwards driving the opponent's head or chest onto the mat.

Dragonrana
In this variant the wrestler performs a front flip from the top rope before executing a true hurricanrana into a pin. The technique is named by and after Dragon Kid, who popularized the maneuver.

Phoenixrana
With this variant the wrestler, facing away from the ring and situated on the top turnbuckle, performs a 180° turn in mid-air and then performs a front flip before executing a pinning hurricanrana.

Shiranui

Invented by Naomichi Marufuji. A backflip inverted facelock drop where a wrestler puts the opponent into a  facelock, then runs up the corner turnbuckles or ring ropes and jump backwards performing a backflip, and landing face down driving the opponent down to the mat back-first. Sometimes a standing variant is performed by wrestlers with adequate leaping ability or when assisted by a tag team partner. The move is popularly known, especially in North America, as Sliced Bread No. 2, a name created by wrestler Brian Kendrick. In a slight variation named sitout shiranui the wrestler lands into a seated position instead, driving the opponent's head between the legs.

Sunset flip
A pinning move where wrestler and opponent face each other, with the wrestler on higher ground (such as the top turnbuckle). The wrestler dives over the opponent, catches them in a waistlock from behind, and rolls into a sitting position  landing onto the mat. As the wrestler rolls over, the opponent is pulled over backwards, landing back first in a rana.

Transition moves
Some moves are meant neither to pin an opponent, nor weaken them or force them to submit, but intended to set up the attack on the opponent.

Corkscrew
The term implies adding a spiral resembling a corkscrew to a maneuver. It can also refer to the motion when a backflip is twisted around so the attacker faces the inside of the ring instead of the outside when the maneuver ends.

Moonsault

A wrestler executes a backflip and lands torso first on the opponent. A basic moonsault is generally attempted from the top turnbuckle, though myriad variations exist.

Ropewalk
As the name implies, this term is used to refer to any move which sees the attacking wrestler walking along the top rope before performing a move.

Shooting star
When a wrestler jumps forward from an elevated position and executes a mid-air backflip. Many techniques can be performed.

Slingshot
When a wrestler, standing on the ring apron, pulls on the top rope using the momentum to hurl over the ropes and into the ring.

Somersault
A simple front-flip used to modify an aerial technique. A corkscrew is often added to the somersault to further modify a move.

Springboard

When a wrestler using any of the ring ropes bounces upward. Most high-flying techniques can be performed after a spring board. Sometimes wrestlers will bounce off one set of ring ropes then off another to perform a move, this is referred to as a double springboard. A variation of a springboard is the rope run or climb, in which a wrestler runs up, effectively with one foot off each ring rope.

Modifiers

Plancha
An accepted term in American wrestling for a slingshot crossbody where the wrestler goes from the inside of the ring over the top ring rope to the outside. In lucha libre, this variant is often called a "pescado" (Spanish for "fish") since a proper plancha is referring to any kind of crossbody. In America, however, a move from the top turnbuckle to a standing opponent on the outside where the chests impact each other is commonly referred to as such. It is also used to refer to any attack from the ring to the outside in which the wrestlers' chests impact each other. For example, a shooting star press to the outside onto a standing opponent is referred to as a shooting star plancha.

Standing
The term is used to refer to any move performed at the same level the opponent, usually right on the mat, rather than most aerial moves where the attacking wrestler performs them from a raised platform.

Suicide
Often referred to in Spanish, suicida, is a term placed before any move that goes from any of the ring parts to the outside of the ring. The most common example is the suicide dive known as topé suicida (Spanish for "suicide headbutt").
When a somersault is performed after leaping through the ropes, or by jumping over the top rope, to land on the opponent back first, the move is known as a suicide senton or topé con giro (Sp. spinning headbutt). Outside Mexico, the move is incorrectly referred to as topé con hilo, for it was mistranslated in Japan (Since hilo in Spanish actually means thread) and the term has remained as such.

Super
This term (often exchanged for diving, elevated, top-rope, or avalanche) is placed before any move performed normally on the mat but when executed off the top-or second rope.

Topé
A topé (from the original Spanish tope, meaning headbutt), like the plancha, is a move most often performed by jumping from the inside of the ring and out, but instead of going over the top rope, the topé is performed by leaping forward through the ropes in order to strike the opponent with the head. In Mexico, topé also refers to any variation of a  battering ram.

See also

 Professional wrestling holds
 Professional wrestling throws
 Professional wrestling strikes
 Professional wrestling double-team maneuvers
 Glossary of professional wrestling terms

Notes

Professional wrestling moves
Jumping sports